Hydreliox is an exotic breathing gas mixture of helium, oxygen and hydrogen.  For the Hydra VIII (Hydra 8) mission at 50 atmospheres of ambient pressure, the mixture used was 49% hydrogen, 50.2% helium, and 0.8% oxygen.

It is used primarily for research and scientific deep diving, usually below . Below this depth, extended breathing of heliox gas mixtures may cause high pressure nervous syndrome (HPNS). Two gas mixtures exist that attempt to combat this problem: trimix and hydreliox. Like trimix, hydreliox contains helium and oxygen and a third gas to counteract HPNS. The third gas in trimix is nitrogen and the third gas in hydreliox is hydrogen. Because hydrogen is the lightest gas, it is easier to breathe than nitrogen under high pressure.  To avoid the risk of explosion, as a rule of thumb hydrogen is only considered for use in breathing mixtures if the proportion of oxygen in the mixture is less than 5%. However, the pressure during the dive must be such that the partial pressure of 5% oxygen is sufficient to sustain the diver. (The flammability of the mixture also depends to some degree on the pressure)

The diving depth record for off-shore (saturation) diving was achieved in 1988 by a team of professional divers (Th.
The diver stayed only a few hours at the simulated  depth, and took 43 days to complete the record experimental dive.

See also
Argox
Heliox
Hydrox
Nitrox
Trimix

References

Breathing gases
Helium
Hydrogen technologies